Wu Xize  (born 19 October 1996), also known as Caesar Wu, is a Chinese actor, singer and model. He is best known for his role as Ximen Yan in the television series Meteor Garden (2018), which propelled him to international fame.

Early life
Caesar Wu was born on 19 October 1996 in Shenzhen, Guangdong Province of China.

Career
Caesar rose to fame with his debut role as Ximen Yan in the 2018 television series Meteor Garden, the remake of popular Taiwanese drama series Meteor Garden and based on the Japanese shōjo manga series  written by Yoko Kamio.
Caesar appeared in Harper's Bazaar China with his Meteor Garden costars Dylan Wang, Darren Chen and Connor Leong in the November issue.

In 2018, he participated in Hunan Satellite TV's variety show Happy Camp and CCTV Sports Channel's football-themed talk show Qi Tan Eleven.

In 2019, Caesar was cast in the youth historical drama The Chang'an Youth, and historical romance drama General's Lady.

In 2021, he starred in the costume romance micro-drama, The Dreamlike Seal . 

In 2022, he starred in the fantasy suspense romance drama, Shining For One Thing.

Filmography

Film

Television series

Variety Show

Discography

References

External links
 
 
  - Caesar Wu's previeous instagram account was (caesarwu_). Note that it was hacked and wasn't recovered. On March 24, 2021, Inga Griese (editor-in-chief on Icon Magazine), F3 and Shen Yue's good friend posted on Instagram that Caesar Wu has a new instagram account and that is (caesarwu_1019).

Chinese male television actors
21st-century Chinese male actors
1996 births
Living people
People from Shenzhen